The 1935–36 season was the 38th in the history of the Southern League. The league consisted of Eastern and Western Divisions. Margate won the Eastern Division whilst Plymouth Argyle reserves won the Western Division. Margate were declared Southern League champions after winning a championship play-off 3–1.

Three Southern League clubs applied to join the Football League, but none were successful. After four clubs left at the end of the season, the league was restructured into a single division for the 1936–37 season.

Eastern Division

There were no new clubs in the Eastern Division this season.

Western Division

A total of nine teams contest the division, including eight from previous season and one new team, Cheltenham Town.

Football League election
Bath City, Dartford and Folkestone applied for election to Division Three South of the Football League. However, both League clubs were re-elected.

References

1935-36
4
1935–36 in Welsh football